

DA 40mm f/2.8 Limited 
The smc Pentax-DA 40mm f/2.8 Limited is a pancake lens for the Pentax K-mount. The lens has a 35mm equivalent focal length of 60mm; it is part of the Limited series of high-performance compact lenses. In August 2013 it was re-released with improved lens coatings and rounded aperture blades as HD Pentax-DA 40mm f/2.8 Limited.

DA 40mm f/2.8 XS 
It features an aesthetic design by Marc Newson to match the Pentax K-01. It is currently one of the thinnest autofocus pancake lenses ever made.

References

External links

DA 40mm f2.8 Limited Official product page at Ricoh Imaging
DA 40mm f2.8 XS Official product page at Ricoh Imaging
PENTAX Introduces an Ultra-Thin 40mm Lens for the Digital SLRs, press release at Ricoh Imaging
Examples of images list for 40mm XS, PENTAX K-1 Laboratory
Pentax DA 35mm F2.4 vs 40mm XS vs 40mm Limited Review at PentaxForums.com

40
Pancake lenses
Camera lenses introduced in 2004